Nambirajan is an Indian film director who has worked on Tamil films. He made his directorial debut in the 1980s, before proceeding to make Nila (1994) and Chandralekha (1995).

Career
Initially under the name Ranjith Kumar, Nambirajan made several low-budget films in the 1980s. Udhayamagirathu (1981), Manjal Nila (1982), Kunguma Pottu (1982), Anbe Odi Vaa (1984) and Ungalil Oruvan (1985) were made in quick succession. He changed his name to and Nambirajan made Nila (1994) featuring Jayaram in the lead role, before working with Vijay in Chandralekha (1995). A further film with Ajith Kumar during the period titled Muthu Pechi, failed to materialise. In the late 1990s, he launched two films where he was set to be director and actor, Getti Maellam alongside Khushbu and then Rukkumani opposite Sri Kanya. Neither film was released, despite the former having an audio launch.

In 2009, Nambirajan revealed that he had changed his name to MGR Nambi and was worked on producing and directing a new project titled Poruthiru for his new production house, MGR Studios. The name change was reportedly as a result of his close ties with actor M. G. Ramachandran, who had advised Nambirajan to join the Adyar Film Institute as a teenager. He also started his own recording studio in Saligramam for films to complete post-production work. The shoot for Poruthiru developed through 2010 with newcomers in the lead role, but the film failed to get a theatrical release. Similarly another film titled Sudalai Mannan, a tale on a  revolutionary who fought against the British empire, failed to materialise. He then launched an audacious project titled Kaala Bhairavi, a multilingual film reportedly with a budget of 100 crores, which was to feature foreign actors Robert Johnson and Alicia, along with Bharath Reddy. The film failed to develop post a grand launch event.

Filmography

References

Living people
20th-century Indian film directors
Tamil film directors
Year of birth missing (living people)